The J. Colin English School (also known as the J. Colin English Elementary School) is a historic school in North Fort Myers, Florida, United States. It is located at 120 Pine Island Road. On July 8, 1999, it was added to the U.S. National Register of Historic Places.

This property is part of the Lee County Multiple Property Submission, a Multiple Property Submission to the National Register. The school is named for Florida school superintendent J. Colin English.

References

 Florida's Office of Cultural and Historical Programs
 Lee County listings
 J. Colin English Elementary School

External links
 J. Colin English Elementary School - official site

Public elementary schools in Florida
National Register of Historic Places in Lee County, Florida
Schools in Lee County, Florida